Ian Gallagher is a character from the British programme and U.S. remake, Shameless.

Ian Gallagher or Gallacher is also the name of:

Ian Gallagher (cricketer) on List of Queensland first-class cricketers
 Ian Gallacher, Welsh rugby player
Ian Gallagher (footballer), retired English footballer